Thomas Hill, born Harwood (1693-11 June 1782}, was one of the two MPs for Shrewsbury in the English parliament from 1749 to 1768. He was nephew to the financier Richard Hill of Hawkstone, from whom he took his surname and was succeeded by his son Noel Hill.

References

Members of the Parliament of Great Britain for English constituencies
British MPs 1754–1761
British MPs 1761–1768